Stephen Knowlton Lane was the Mayor of Bayonne, New Jersey from 1879 to 1883.

Biography
Lane was born in Manhattan, New York City in November 1833. He became a member of the New York Produce Exchange. He married Euphemia Fox of Natchez, Mississippi on February 6, 1856. Lane moved to Bayonne in 1858.

A Republican, Lane was elected as a councilman in 1876. Running unopposed in 1878, he was elected mayor of Bayonne succeeding Henry Meigs. Ward was re-elected in 1879 defeating Democrat councilman David W. Oliver. While mayor, Lane oversaw a project to bring water into Bayonne. His attempt at a third term ended when he lost to Oliver in 1883. Business problems forced him to retire from public service.

Lane died from heart failure at age 63 in his home on November 14, 1896.

References

1833 births
1896 deaths
Mayors of Bayonne, New Jersey
19th-century American politicians
New Jersey Republicans